Pichathy Kuttappan is a 1979 Indian Malayalam-language film,  directed by P. Venu. The film stars Prem Nazir, Jayan, Sheela and Sharada. The film's score was composed by K. Raghavan.

Cast
 Prem Nazir as Pichathy Kuttappan
 Jayan as Raghu
 Sheela
 Sharada as Thankamma
 KPAC Lalitha
 Sukumari as Saraswathi
 Jose Prakash as Raman Muthalali
 Alummoodan as Paropakari Narayanan
 Bahadoor as Paachan
 Kaduvakulam Antony
 Mallika Sukumaran
 P. K. Abraham
 Sreelatha Namboothiri as CID Radha
 Sam(A.T.Samuel)
 Poojappura Ravi as Pappan

Soundtrack
The music was composed by K. Raghavan with lyrics by Yusufali Kechery.

References

External links
 

1979 films
1970s Malayalam-language films